Parris Mitchell Mayhew (born 1964) is an American musician, songwriter, director and camera operator. 

He is best known as co-founder and songwriter of the New York Hardcore band Cro-Mags. He has played in a number of bands, including White Devil, the MAD, Sămsära, Psychic Orgy, and Aggros. 

Mayhew also directed numerous music videos and later worked as a motion picture and television camera operator.

Biography
Parris Mayhew was born and raised in New York City, New York. His father Aubrey Mayhew worked in the music industry and sparked Parris' interest to music in 1970's. Mayhew cited Jimmy Page, Steve Howe, Alex Lifeson and Joe Perry as his early music influences when he learned to play guitar. Mayhew graduated from the High School of Art and Design and from The School of Visual Arts, New York City in 1989 with a bachelor's degree in Fine Arts Film. His music career began in 1979 at age 15, when he joined NYC punk staples The MAD. He now lives with his wife Barblin Mayhew in Brooklyn, New York.

Career

Directing and cinematographer career
While making music in Cro-Mags, Parris began directing music videos, first for Cro-Mags and then for other music bands, including Anthrax, Biohazard ("Shades of Gray", "Punishment", "Tales From The Hard Side", "After Forever"), Onyx ("Slam"), Run DMC ("Ooh Whatcha Gonna Do?"), Type O Negative ("Black No. 1"), Public Enemy, Sepultura, Nuclear Assault, Flotsam and Jetsam, Gang Green, among dozens others.

From 2003, Mayhew worked as a camera operator in many projects for the International Cinematographers Guild (also known as "Local 600). He is a member of the Society of Camera Operators and co-founder of Wildfire NYC, where he also works as director and cameraman.

Music career
Mayhew is a founding member, songwriter and guitarist of Cro-Mags, where he created music and played from 1980-1990 and 1996-2001. He is also a founding member of White Devil. He played in other music bands including Sămsära and Psychic Orgy. In 2020, Mayhew founded Aggros, a new instrumental hardcore/metal band based in NYC. The band's first single "Chaos Magic" was released without label via Mayhew's YouTube channel in October 2020.

Discography

Cro-Mags
Age of Quarrel (1986)
Best Wishes (1989)
Revenge (2000)

Aggros
Chaos Magic (2020)
Rise of the Aggros (2023)

Dispute over Cro-Mags Domain Name 
Cro-Mags domain name ownership was a matter of dispute when Savoia NYC, an entity related to Harley Flanagan, filed the complaint with the World Intellectual Property Organization (WIPO). As Domain Name Wire states: " Mayhew was co-owner of an entity with Flanagan that held a trademark for Cro-Mags when he registered the domain name in 1999." However WIPO rejected to grant domain name to Flanagan citing abuse of policy. As a result, Mayhew remained the owner of the original Cro-Mags website.

References

External links
Cro-Mags Website

Living people
American guitarists
American punk rock bass guitarists
American bass guitarists
Cro-Mags members
American songwriters
Musicians from New York City
1964 births